Klariza L. Clayton (born 9 March 1989) is a British actress and singer. She is best known for her roles in the CBBC comedy Dani's House (2008–2012), the E4 drama Skins (2009–2010), the Nickelodeon series House of Anubis (2011–2013), and the Netflix sitcom Lovesick (2016–2018).

Early life
Clayton was born in Hong Kong to an English father and a Filipino mother and grew up in South London.

Career
Clayton began her career in 2007 with a brief role on the CBBC show Young Dracula as Delila. From 2008 to 2012, she played Sam on the comedy Dani's House, also on CBBC, as a series regular for the first four series and a guest star for the fifth series. In 2009, she landed a recurring role in the E4 teen drama Skins as Karen Mclair, the older sister of Freddie Mclair (Luke Pasqualino) and made her film debut with a minor role in Harry Brown. In 2011, Clayton began starring as Joy Mercer in the Nickelodeon mystery series House of Anubis, going on to appear in 141 episodes of the series.

From 2016 to 2018, Clayton appeared in the Netflix comedy-drama Lovesick as Holly. She starred in the horror films Fox Trap, Blood Money, and Suicide Club.

Filmography

Film

Television

Music videos

Video games

Stage

References

External links

Living people
1989 births
Actresses from London
British actresses of Asian descent
English film actresses
English people of Filipino descent
English stage actresses
English television actresses
Hong Kong people of English descent
Hong Kong people of Filipino descent
People from the London Borough of Croydon